Nikolai Olimpievich Gritsenko (24 July 1912 – 8 December 1979) was a Soviet and Russian theater and film actor. He appeared in more than 30 films between 1942 and 1978. Gritsenko also was member of the Vakhtangov Theatre company in Moscow, Russia. There he was designated Honored Artist of the RSFSR and People's Artist of the USSR.  He died on 8 December 1979, and was buried in the Novodevichy Cemetery, in Moscow, Russia.

Partial filmography

 Mashenka (1942) - Kolya
 Starinnyy vodevil (1947) - Lt. Anton Petrovich Fadeev
 Proshchay, Amerika! (1949)
 Dream of a Cossack (1951) - Artamashov
 The Night Before Christmas (1951) - Vakula (voice)
 Hostile Whirlwinds (1953) - Schreder
 Marina's Destiny (1953) - Terenty
 The Safety Match (1954) - Psekov, estate manager
 A Big Family (1954) - club manager
 The Road (1955) - Ivan Alekseevich
The Sisters (1957)
 Vosemnadtsatyy god (1958)
 Khmuroe utro (1959) - Vadim Roshchin
 Volnyy veter (1961) - Georg Stan
 Barrier of the Unknown (1962) - Vadim Lagin
 Ponedelnik: den tyazhyolyy (1964) - Kuzma Yegorovich Stryapkov
 Russkiy les (1964) - Aleksandr Gratsiyansky
 Mat i machekha (1964) - Fedor Zhurbenko
 Man without a Passport (1966) - Pyotr Izmaylov
 Dva goda nad propastyu (1966) - Colonel Miller
 Mesta tut tikhie (1967) - Saveliy Petrovich Fisyuk
 Anna Karenina (1967) - Karenin
 Aprum er mi mard (1968)
 Zhuravushka (1969) - Markelov
 Razvyazka (1969) - Terekhov
 The Adjutant of His Excellency (1970, TV Series) - Vikentiy Pavlovich Speransky
 Family Happiness (1970) - Vaksin
 Ya, Frantsisk Skorina... (1970) - Reichenberg
 Schastye Anny (1971) - Prokhor Lychkov
 Veseli Zhabokrychi (1971) - Vasil Mironovich 
 The Land of Sannikov (1973) - Trifon Stepanovich Perfilyev, gold mines
 Chyornyy prints (1973) - Ananiy Mytnikov
 Seventeen Moments of Spring (1973, TV Mini-Series) - general in the train
 The Land of Sannikov (1973) - Trifon Perfilyev
 Chelovek v shtatskom (1973) - baron Erich von Ostenfelzen
 Doker (1973)
 Vremya ee synovey (1974) - Anton Trofimovich Gulyayev
 Prestuplenie (1976) - Pyotr Yegorovich
 Stazhyor (1976) - Aleksandr Trofimov
 Vragi (1978) - General Pechenegov
 Ssylnyy 011 (1978) - Varlamtsev
 Father Sergius (1979) - General Korotkov
 Myatezhnaya barrikada (1979)

References

External links

1912 births
1979 deaths
People from Yasynuvata
Cannes Film Festival Award for Best Actor winners
Honored Artists of the RSFSR
People's Artists of the RSFSR
People's Artists of the USSR
Stalin Prize winners

Recipients of the Order of the Red Banner of Labour
Russian male film actors
Russian male stage actors
Russian male television actors
Soviet male film actors
Soviet male stage actors
Soviet male television actors
Burials at Novodevichy Cemetery